Events in the year 2001 in Turkey.

Incumbents
President: Ahmet Necdet Sezer
Prime Minister: Bülent Ecevit

Deaths
1 April - Ayhan Şahenk, Turkish businessman, founded Doğuş Holding (b. 1929)
11 September - Hikmet Şimşek.
22 September - Fikret Kızılok.

References

 
Years of the 21st century in Turkey
Turkey
Turkey
Turkey
2000s in Turkey